Carsick Cars is a Chinese indie rock trio formed in March 2005.

Carsick Cars released their self-titled debut album in 2007 on Maybe Mars in China and on tenzenmen in Australia. The band joined Sonic Youth for their European tour in Prague and Vienna in 2007.  A 7" single of tracks taken from that album was released in the UK by Suyin Records. In June 2009, the band released their second album, You Can Listen, You Can Talk. In March 2010, 2011, and 2012 Carsick Cars performed at the SXSW music festival in Austin, Texas.

As of November 2010, Li Weisi and Li Qing left the band to focus on their other projects. They were replaced by He Fan (Birdstriking) on bass and Ben Ben (BOYZ & GIRL, Skip Skip Ben Ben). Ben Ben was subsequently replaced by  Houzi.

Li Weisi (bass) and Li Qing (drums) returned in 2017 and remain in the band.

Their debut song, Zhong Nan Hai, has been cited as the anthem for the Beijing underground music scene.

Notable performances 
 August 25, 2007: Prague (with Sonic Youth)
 August 26, 2007: Vienna (with Sonic Youth)
 October 2–4, 2007: Modern Sky Festival, Beijing

Discography 
 2007: Beijing Volume Two (EP)
 2007: Carsick Cars
 2009: You Can Listen, You Can Talk
 2011: She Will Wait / Could You Be There (Cassette Only)
 2013: The Other 3 (EP)
 2014: 3
 2020: Wake Me Up (Single)

References

External links 
 Carsick Cars official website
 Carsick Cars on Douban
 
 Carsick Cars @ RiC Wiki, complete biography

Chinese indie rock groups
Chinese rock music groups
Musical groups from Beijing